The three teams in this group played against each other on a home-and-away basis. The group winner Yugoslavia qualified for the 1958 FIFA World Cup held in Sweden.

Table

Matches

References

External links
FIFA official page
RSSSF – 1958 World Cup Qualification
Allworldcup

7
1956–57 in Greek football
1957–58 in Greek football
1956–57 in Romanian football
1957–58 in Romanian football
1956–57 in Yugoslav football
Qual